Norman Julius "Boomer" Esiason (born April 17, 1961) is an American former professional football player who was a quarterback in the National Football League (NFL) for 14 seasons, primarily with the Cincinnati Bengals. He was selected in the second round of the 1984 NFL Draft by the Bengals, where he spent 10 non-consecutive seasons. Esiason was also a member of the New York Jets and Arizona Cardinals.

During his playing career, Esiason was named to four Pro Bowls and one first-team All-Pro selection. His most successful season came with the Bengals in 1988 when he won NFL Most Valuable Player (MVP) and led the team to a Super Bowl appearance in Super Bowl XXIII, which ended in a close defeat. After nine years in Cincinnati, Esiason spent three seasons with the Jets and one season with the Cardinals before returning to the Bengals for his final season in 1997.

Since retiring from football, Esiason has worked as a football analyst for CBS Sports on The NFL Today and Showtime's Inside the NFL and was previously with ABC, HBO, and Westwood One. He also hosts the morning sports radio program Boomer and Gio on WFAN in New York.

Early life
Esiason was born and raised in East Islip, New York. He got the "Boomer" nickname before he was born. His mother Irene, reacting to his constant kicking in the womb, called him "Boomer," and he has kept the name since.   Irene, a singer, dancer and piano player, from whom he inherited his blond hair and blue eyes, died at the age of 37 of ovarian cancer when he was seven years old. His father Norman, a veteran of WWII, never remarried, and in spite of a three-hour daily commute to New York City raised Esiason and his two sisters.  His father was of Norwegian and Swedish descent; grandmother Nora Ingrid Gulbrandsen was born in Norway and his grandfather Fritz Henning Esiason was born in Sweden. His father was the cousin of Norwegian actress and singer Sølvi Wang.

He attended Timber Point Elementary and East Islip High School, where he graduated in 1979. In high school, he was a three-sport varsity player in football, basketball, and baseball.

College football career
Esiason played college football at the University of Maryland for head coaches Jerry Claiborne and Bobby Ross and offensive coordinator Ralph Friedgen. Maryland was the only college to offer him a scholarship. At Maryland, he set 17 school records. He completed 461 of 850 passes (54.2 percent) for 6,169 yards and 42 touchdowns with 27 interceptions.  He was a two-time honorable mention All-American in 1982 and 1983.  In his final home game, he threw two third-quarter touchdown passes to lead a comeback victory over No. 3 North Carolina and seal the ACC title. At Maryland, his backup was future NFL coach Frank Reich, as well as his roommate. He graduated with a B.A. in 1984 and received the Distinguished Alumnus Award in 1999.

Professional football career

Cincinnati Bengals (1984–1992)
Following his final year at Maryland, Esiason was selected by the Cincinnati Bengals in the second round of the 1984 NFL Draft with the 38th overall pick, surprisingly low considering his successful college career. ESPN draft analyst Mel Kiper Jr. was, in Esiason's words, "going ballistic" that he was still available in the latter stages of the first round. No quarterbacks were drafted in the first round; Esiason was actually the first quarterback selected, as Steve Young had signed with the L.A. Express of the now-defunct United States Football League. Esiason's USFL territorial rights were controlled by the Washington Federals, the worst team in the league.

Esiason's teammate from Maryland, defensive end Pete Koch, was taken by the Bengals with the 16th pick in the first round of the same draft. Koch lasted just one season in Cincinnati and five total in the NFL.

He got his first pro start on October 7, 1984, in Cincinnati in a game against the Houston Oilers. On a rainy day, he led the Bengals to a 13–3 win over Houston and scored the game's only touchdown on a three-yard run. He took over for Ken Anderson as the Bengals' full-time starting quarterback on September 22, 1985, in a loss in Cincinnati to the San Diego Chargers and future Hall of Famer Dan Fouts 44–41. At 6'-5" and 224 pounds with a powerful arm, Esiason was the signal caller on one of the most potent offenses of the late 1980s and, though well short of Ken Anderson's rushing total of over 2,200 yards, was surprisingly mobile, rushing for 1,598 yards on 447 attempts and scoring seven touchdowns by this point in his career. He became particularly adept at running the difficult "no huddle" offense devised by Bengals head coach Sam Wyche.

On December 21, 1986, the final game of the 1986 season, he set a team record by throwing five touchdown passes as the Bengals defeated the New York Jets 52–21. He also set the team single season passing record of 3,959 yards in this game. It was the last game of Bengals' quarterback Ken Anderson's playing career.

After leading Cincinnati to six straight wins to begin the 1988 season, on October 16, 1988, he set a single game team record throwing 5 interceptions in a 27–21 loss to the New England Patriots. The team finished the season 12–4 with the highest scoring offense in the NFL, securing the organization's fifth AFC Central division title. He finished the season as the NFL's top rated passer. Cincinnati defeated the Seattle Seahawks and then the Buffalo Bills in the playoffs to reach Super Bowl XXIII, their second appearance in a Super Bowl (after Super Bowl XVI), a rematch with the San Francisco 49ers. In the game, Bengals cornerback Lewis Billups dropped a sure interception in the end zone which would have sealed a Cincinnati win. The 49ers, led by future Hall of Fame quarterback Joe Montana, marched 92 yards on their last drive and scored on a touchdown pass to receiver John Taylor with 34 seconds remaining in the game. A last-ditch pass by Esiason to wide receiver Cris Collinsworth was broken up, resulting in a 20–16 loss for the Bengals, their second close loss to the 49ers in a Super Bowl.

On October 29, 1989, he tied his own record for touchdown passes in a game as the Bengals demolished the Tampa Bay Buccaneers 56–23. The Bengals tied a team record with eight touchdowns in the game.

On October 7, 1990, he threw for 490 yards (a single game team passing record) in a 34–31 victory over the Los Angeles Rams.

New York Jets (1993–1995)
Esiason, who had worked with Jets head coach Bruce Coslet in Cincinnati, was traded to the Jets for a third round pick in 1993 (which became linebacker Steve Tovar), subsequently guiding their offense until the end of 1995 under three different head coaches: Coslet, Pete Carroll, and Rich Kotite. During his 1995 season with the Jets, he was seriously injured in a game played on October 8 against the Buffalo Bills when rookie Everett McIver was whistled for a false start and Bruce Smith of the Bills raced around him and caught Esiason under his face mask. Smith was terribly upset about Esiason's injury and said he never heard a whistle blowing the play dead for false start. That horrific collision gave Esiason a severe concussion, which kept him out until November 19. He is thought to have been the first NFL player to enter a concussion study during the season. When he returned to the field it was coincidentally in a game that was played against the Bills.

Arizona Cardinals (1996)
After being released by the Jets, Esiason signed with the Arizona Cardinals as a free agent in 1996. It was during this season, on November 10, 1996, that he threw for the fifth best passing yardage day in NFL history, with 522 yards in a 37–34 overtime victory over the Washington Redskins. Two weeks later he led a fourth-quarter comeback against the playoff-bound Philadelphia Eagles.

Second stint with the Cincinnati Bengals (1997)
Esiason contemplated retirement in the off-season, but was talked into playing one more season with the Bengals. He was surprisingly effective after replacing Jeff Blake midway through the 1997 season, throwing for 13 touchdowns with only two interceptions and garnering a passer rating of over 106 for the season. The Bengals were 3–8 with Blake under center. With Esiason at quarterback, they won four of their last five games and scored over 30 points four times – twice they broke 40 points, in a 44–42 loss to the Philadelphia Eagles and a 41–14 rout of the Tennessee Oilers. The Bengals wanted Esiason to come back for two more years.

On December 21, 1997, he played his last NFL game. His last play was a 79-yard touchdown play-action pass to wide receiver Darnay Scott. The touchdown proved to be the winner in a 16–14 victory over the Baltimore Ravens.

NFL career statistics

Records and honors
Esiason was named to four Pro Bowl games (1986, 1988, 1989, 1993) and holds several NFL career records for left-handed quarterbacks, including most touchdown passes (247), passing yards (37,920), and completions (2,969).  He also led the AFC in passing in both 1988 and 1989.

Among the awards he has earned during his career include the NFL Most Valuable Player Award in 1988 (leading the league with a passer rating of 97.4), and the Walter Payton Man of the Year Award in 1995 for his charitable work. At his retirement in 1997 he finished in the top 10 all-time in many QB career statistical categories. 

Football Nation ranks him as the 25th greatest quarterback of the post-merger era.

Esiason was inducted into the Suffolk Sports Hall of Fame in the Football Category with the Class of 1990. In 2004, he was inducted into the Nassau County Sports Hall of Fame.

Entertainment career

Television, film and literature
Esiason has appeared in over 25 commercials including ones for Diet Coke, Wheaties, Reebok, Samsung, Hanes, Doritos and Domino's Pizza. He has also appeared in many TV shows and movies, such as The Game Plan, Miss America 1999, Spin City, and Blue Bloods among others.

He made two appearances on the game show Family Feud. On March 18, 1989, he appeared in the episode "Bengals v. 49ers", reminiscent of their latest Super Bowl match. In 1993, his second Family Feud appearance came in the episode "NFC v. AFC".

He authored a children's reader in 1995 titled A Boy Named Boomer and co-wrote (with Lowell Cauffiel) a 1998 novel titled Toss.

He co-hosted the Miss America Pageant with Meredith Vieira on September 19, 1998, and co-hosted with Julie Chen the CBS broadcast of the 2002 Macy's Thanksgiving Day Parade.

He and partner Craig Carton served as judges on the May 29, 2011, episode of Iron Chef America.

He has co-hosted Super Bowl's Greatest Commercials from 2012 to 2023.

He made a cameo appearance as himself on the October 3, 2014, episode of Blue Bloods.

In 2015, he became the Commissioner of the FFL (Feline Football League) for Kitten Bowl II on the Hallmark Channel, and still holds that position today.  He has provided analysis and commentary for all the Kitten Bowls since Kitten Bowl II, which airs during half time of the Super Bowl.

Esiason launched Game Time With Boomer Esiason, interviews with sports personalities from the past, on Saturday September 14, 2019.

Broadcasting
While still playing, Esiason appeared as a color analyst on the USA Network's two-year broadcast of the World League of American Football (WLAF) on Monday nights, partnered with Brad Nessler. After his retirement from playing, he went into broadcasting full-time. He was a color commentator for ABC's Monday Night Football from 1998 to 1999. Following his dismissal by ABC (due primarily to personal conflicts between him and play-by-play announcer Al Michaels), he was hired by the Westwood One radio network to become the lead analyst for radio broadcasts of Monday Night Football  and Super Bowl games. He broadcast every Super Bowl from SB XXXIV in 2000 to SB LII in 2018, a total of 19, which is a broadcast record.

As planned, after broadcasting the Thursday Night Football game on September 6, 2018, he left Westwood One.  He was quoted as saying "I’m going to miss it, but in all reality I kind of have to get part of my life back." He currently serves as an in-studio analyst for The NFL Today on CBS television, Inside the NFL on Showtime, and hosts Boomer and Gio on WFAN Radio in New York and the CBS Sports Network. In September 2012, CBS Radio announced he was added to their collection of talent to deliver five sports updates per day Monday through Friday.

Starting in 2013, he began appearing once a week as a guest on The Jim Rome Show during the NFL season to break down the upcoming weekend's NFL action.

WFAN morning show

In April 2007, after the firing of Don Imus, CBS Radio gave Esiason a one-week "try-out" as Imus' replacement on WFAN. The station announced him as the permanent host on August 13, with radio veteran Craig Carton joining as co-host. Boomer and Carton officially started on September 4, 2007. As an analyst with Westwood One, Esiason would do the Monday morning show, travel to do the Monday Night Football game and travel back to New York in time to do the Tuesday morning show. The Boomer and Carton radio program became the number-one rated morning show in all key demographics in the greater New York listening area and was seen on the MSG Network from 2010 to 2013. On March 8, 2013, both Esiason and Carton worked the radio broadcast of a Brooklyn Nets basketball game. The radio program had been simulcast on the CBS Sports Network since January 2014. In September 2017, after being arrested and facing charges of operating a concert ticket Ponzi scheme, Carton resigned from WFAN, leaving Esiason as the sole host of the show, which was rebranded The Morning Show with Boomer. On January 2, 2018, the show became Boomer and Gio, when Gregg Giannotti joined him as a permanent co-host.

Personal life
In 1986, Esiason married his wife, Cheryl. They have two children, son Gunnar and daughter Sydney. Sydney is married to New York Islanders forward Matt Martin. While at a Jets mini-camp in 1993, Esiason was notified that two-year-old Gunnar had to be taken to the hospital with breathing difficulties. Soon after, Gunnar was diagnosed with cystic fibrosis. Gunnar is a graduate of Boston College who undergoes daily treatments and takes cystic fibrosis medications. He was a quarterback for his high school football team at Friends Academy in Locust Valley, New York, and played forward on his ice hockey team for the Manhasset/Roslyn varsity hockey team. Gunnar also writes a popular blog and appears daily in a podcast discussing the issues confronting cystic fibrosis patients.

Esiason and his family have lived in the village of Plandome, New York, since at least 1998.

Esiason is an avid ice hockey fan, and a die-hard supporter of the New York Rangers. He is also a fan of the New York Mets and New York Knicks. As of 2019, he plays in up to 70 recreational-league hockey games a year. Gunnar and his father are teammates on their local hockey team. Esiason plays in the annual Mikey Strong Charity Hockey game with NHL alumni. His foundation sponsors the annual Guinness Cup Hockey Tournament.

Boomer Esiason Foundation
The Boomer Esiason Foundation (BEF) was formed soon after Gunnar's diagnosis to fund research to find a cure for cystic fibrosis. The foundation also provides scholarships, transplant grants, hospital grants, and education and awareness of CF to help provide a higher quality of life for people with CF. The foundation has raised in excess of $100 million, and has supported numerous hospitals, including Cincinnati Children's Hospital with the Gunnar H Esiason CF/Lung Center and Columbia Presbyterian in NYC with the Gunnar H Esiason Adult CF and Lung Program. In 2018 the foundation awarded over $400,000 in scholarships to almost 100 students. The foundation is located in New York City and runs numerous events around the country. The foundation annually receives four stars from Charity Navigator.

In 1996, Esiason formed a partnership with Cantor Fitzgerald and Howard Lutnick (CEO) as the foundation offices were moved to the North Tower of the World Trade Center in lower Manhattan on the 101st floor, which was destroyed in 2001 in the September 11 attacks. All five full-time employees survived, as none were in the building at the time, but "Esiason figured he knew over 100 people personally" who were killed in the attack, including his best friend Tim O'Brien who was a partner at Cantor.

See also
 List of 500-yard passing games in the National Football League
 List of NFL quarterbacks who have posted a perfect passer rating

References

External links
 Boomer Esiason Foundation Fighting Cystic Fibrosis

1961 births
American Conference Pro Bowl players
American football quarterbacks
American people of Norwegian descent
American sports radio personalities
American television sports announcers
American television talk show hosts
Arizona Cardinals players
Cincinnati Bengals players
College football announcers
Living people
Maryland Terrapins football players
National Football League announcers
National Football League Most Valuable Player Award winners
New York Jets players
People from East Islip, New York
People from West Islip, New York
Players of American football from New York (state)
Sportspeople from Nassau County, New York
Sportspeople from Suffolk County, New York
Ed Block Courage Award recipients